Haymilk is dairy milk produced from animals that have mainly been fed fresh grass and (dry) hay, rather than fermented fodder. The milk is thus produced according to the tradition in the Alps. The term haymilk is registered as a traditional speciality guaranteed in the UK and the European Union, and can only be used for milk produced corresponding to those specifications.

Production
The milk can only be produced from animals that received mainly hay (winter) and "fresh grass, leguminous plants and foliage" in summer, but also roughage like green rapeseed, green maize, green rye and fodder beets is permitted. For a maximum of 25%, also cereal crops (wheat, oats, rye, etc.) and beans, field peas, lupins, oleaginous fruits. Products like sewage sludge, fallen fruit, urea and potatoes can not be used.

Traditional speciality guaranteed
Three different products were registered as a traditional speciality guaranteed, depending on the animal that is the source of the milk. In each case the name is registered in 5 languages, while a 2021 amendment request has been published to also include the name in Slovenian.

Use in cheese 
Several cheeses must be made from haymilk: for example the protected designation of origin cheeses Vorarlberger Bergkäse, Vorarlberger Alpkäse, Tiroler Bergkäse and  Tiroler Almkäse.

See also 
 Baked milk
 Condensed milk
 Evaporated milk
 Powdered milk
 Clotted cream
 Warm milk

References 

Milk
Traditional Speciality Guaranteed products from Austria